Ram Kanwar Bairwa, also spelt Berwa, is an Indian politician. He was elected to the Lok Sabha, the lower house of the Parliament of India, from Tonk in Rajasthan, as a member of the Janata Party.

References

External links
Official biographical sketch in Parliament of India website
 Second Official biographical sketch in Parliament of India website

India MPs 1967–1970
India MPs 1971–1977
Lok Sabha members from Rajasthan
1933 births
Living people
Janata Party politicians